The Denmark Rugby League is the governing body for the sport of rugby league football in Denmark and the Denmark national rugby league team, formed in 2009.

References

External links

Rugby league governing bodies in Europe
Rugby league in Denmark
Rugby League
Sports organizations established in 2009
2009 establishments in Denmark